Toymaster is a British buying group association of independently owned toy stores, founded in 1977. Whilst some members brand themselves as Toymaster, others choose to retain their own branding to promote their independence. The association is known for its yellow and red fascia to suit the flag of Dorset, with the mascots being its two brown puppies, named Tilly And Tyler. As of June 2021, the association has members spanning the United Kingdom and Ireland, as well as outlets in Jersey, Guernsey and a store in Malta.

Background

The member stores comprise a variety of different outlets, including toy stores, garden centres, department stores, post offices and others. Its head office provides central support to its member retailers, mainly finance and marketing, including a year-round window display program to help independent retailers promote key toy brands within their stores. The central office also provides information and support to its member stores to help them trade more profitably.

In 2012, Toby the mascot was given his own Apple iPhone app.

See also 

 Smyths
 The Entertainer (retailer)
 Hamleys

References

External links

 

Retail companies of the United Kingdom
Retail companies established in 1977
Companies based in Northampton
Toy retailers of the United Kingdom